Conopharyngine is the major alkaloid present in the leaves and stem-bark of Tabernaemontana pachysiphon and Conopharyngia durissima. It is closely related voacangine and coronaridine. Conopharyngine pseudoindoxyl, a derivative of it, is also found in the same plant Tabernaemontana pachysiphon.

Pharmacology 
It possess central nervous system stimulant activity and produces bradycardia and hypotension in cats. It has weak acetylcholinesterase inhibitory activity and significantly increases hexobarbitone induced sleeping time.

Toxicity 
It has low intravenous toxicity in mice (LD50 = 143 mg/kg).

See also 
 Ibogaline

References 

Alkaloids found in Iboga
Methoxy compounds
Heterocyclic compounds with 5 rings
Methyl esters
Nitrogen heterocycles
Tryptamine alkaloids